The 2007-08 New Zealand Football Championship was the fourth season which began on 3 November 2007 and ended on 20 April 2008. Waitakere United won both the premiership and the grand final.

Team locations

League table

Regular season

Round 1

Round 2

Round 3

Round 4

Round 5

Round 6

Round 7

Round 8

Round 9

Round 10

Round 11

Round 12

Round 13

Round 14

Round 15

Round 16

Round 17

Round 18

Round 19

Round 20

Round 21

Finals
The top 3 ranked teams of the regular season will qualify for the NZFC playoffs. Teams ranked second and third will play off in a preliminary final, the winner of which playing the first ranked team in the grand final.

Bracket

Preliminary Finals

Grand Final

Notes

New Zealand Football Championship seasons
1
New
New